The Lazzaretto of Ancona, also called the Mole Vanvitelliana, is a pentagonal 18th-century building built on an artificial island as a quarantine station for the port town of Ancona, Italy.

The island is now connected to the mainland by three bridges. The building was commissioned by Pope Clement XII, designed by the architect Luigi Vanvitelli, and built from 1733−1743. It originally had only one link to the mainland. A well was located in the central Neoclassical tempietto dedicated to Saint Roch, invoked against the plague, in the center of the courtyard. It was built to house possibly-infected travellers and goods arriving in the port.

Over the years, the site has taken different functions, mainly as a military citadel since the 19th century. During World War I, there was a failed attempt to sabotage the Italian naval resources by 60 infiltrating Habsburg sailors. Now it is used as a site of the museum Tattile Omero, as well as home for various exhibitions.

It is not clear why a pentagonal shape was chosen for the building. However, the rationalistic and functional ensemble is common to many works of late Enlightenment architecture. The efforts of this work can be compared to the contemporary architecture of institutions meant to provide geometrically compelling structures to house services for the poor in Naples by Fernando Fuga, such as the massive Royal Hospice and Hospital for the Poor and the mathematical Cemetery of the 366 Fossae.

References

Sources

 
 

Buildings and structures in Ancona
Leper colonies
Neoclassical architecture in le Marche
Quarantine facilities in Italy
Medical and health organisations based in Italy
Luigi Vanvitelli buildings